Długa is a river of Poland, which flows into the Żerański Canal north of Warsaw.

In Polish, the name of the river can be literally translated as "long".

Rivers of Poland
Rivers of Masovian Voivodeship